Wollen may refer to 
Malcolm Wollen (1928–2013), Indian air marshal
Peter Wollen (1938–2019), English film theorist and writer
Philip Wollen (born 1950), Australian humanitarian philanthropist
William Barnes Wollen (1857–1936), English painter